Sirota, Sierota, Sirotta or Syrota (Cyrillic: сирота) is a gender-neutral Slavic surname meaning orphan. It may refer to:

Alexander Sirota (born 1976), Ukrainian photographer
Beate Sirota (1923–2012), American performing arts director
Benny Sirota (?–?), one of the founders of the Troika Pottery
David Sirota (born 1975), American writer
Gershon Sirota (1874–1943), Ukrainian musician
Leo Sirota (1885–1965), Ukrainian pianist
Louanne Sirota (born 1970), American actress
Lyubov Sirota (born 1956), Ukrainian writer
Milton Sirotta (1911–1981), American who coined the word "googol"
Nick Sirota (born 1984), American ice hockey player
Ruslan Sirota (born 1980), Ukrainian musician
Oleksandr Syrota (born 2000), Ukrainian footballer
Sydney Sierota, American musician
Svyatoslav Syrota (born 1970), Ukrainian football player and administrator

See also
Echosmith
Serota (disambiguation)

References

Slavic-language surnames
Ukrainian-language surnames
Jewish surnames